Asherah was the first commercially built American research submersible, owned by the University of Pennsylvania and used by archaeologist George F. Bass to examine underwater sites. It was named after Asherah, an ancient Semitic goddess known as "she who treads on the sea".

Commissioned in 1963 and launched in 1964, it was used to develop a new system of stereoscopy, and allowed Bass to become the first to use side-scanning sonar to locate a shipwreck.

In 1967, under Bass' direction, Asherah was used to photograph an ancient Byzantine shipwreck at a depth of 285 feet near Yassi Ada island, off the coast of Turkey.

References

Research submarines of the United States
1964 ships